The 2016 Georgia House of Representatives elections took place as part of the biennial United States elections. Georgia voters elected state representatives in all 180 of the state house's districts. State representatives serve two-year terms in the Georgia House of Representatives.

Detailed results by district
2016 election results:

References

2016 Georgia (U.S. state) elections
Georgia House of Representatives elections
Georgia House of Representatives